John of Monmouth DD (a.k.a. John de Monemuta; died 1323) was a medieval university Chancellor and Bishop of Llandaff.

John of Monmouth was Chancellor of the University of Oxford in England during 1322–24. He was a Doctor of Divinity. He was later Bishop of Llandaff in Wales from 1297 to his death in 1323.

See also
 Monmouth in Wales

References

Year of birth unknown
1323 deaths
Chancellors of the University of Oxford
Bishops of Llandaff
13th-century English Roman Catholic bishops
14th-century English Roman Catholic bishops